List of LGBT medical organizations, consisting of lesbian, gay, bisexual, and transgender (LGBT) medical professionals, promoting LGBT health, or supportive and affirming of the LGBT community.

International
 GLMA: Health Professionals Advancing LGBT Equality
 World Professional Association for Transgender Health

Australia and Oceania

Australia
 National LGBTI Health Alliance

Europe

Ireland
 Gay Doctors Ireland
 The Rainbow Project

United Kingdom
 CHAPS
 GMFA
 LGBTI Health Summit
 Project for Advice, Counselling and Education

Italy
 AMIGAY aps

North America

United States
 Association of LGBTQ Psychiatrists
 Callen-Lorde Community Health Center
 Fenway Health
 Gay City Health Project
 GMHC
 Howard Brown Health

 LGBTI Health Summit
 LGBTQ Health Caucus 
 Mazzoni Center
 The Mpowerment Project
 National LGBT Cancer Network
 Rainbow Health Initiative (Minnesota)
 Touro University Rainbow Health Coalition
 UCSF Alliance Health Project
 Whitman-Walker Health

See also
 Timeline of sexual orientation and medicine

References 

Sexual orientation and medicine
Medical organizations